Acacia lirellata is a shrub belonging to the genus Acacia and the subgenus Juliflorae that is endemic to south western Australia.

Description
It has glabrous or minutely haired and straight to flexuose ribbed branchlets. Like most species of Acacia it has phyllodes rather than true leaves. The erect and flat evergreen phyllodes have a  narrowly linear shape but can be curved or serpentinous. It blooms from June to August and produces yellow flowers. The simple inflorescences occur in pairs in the axils and have an obloid to subglobular shape that is rarely cylindrical. The firmly crustaceous or thinly coriaceous seed pods that form after flowering resemble a string of beads and are straight or loosely coiled. The glossy dark brown seeds within the pods are arranged longitudinally.

Taxonomy
There are two recognised subspecies:
 Acacia lirellata subsp. compressa
 Acacia lirellata subsp. lirellata

Distribution
It is native to an area in the Wheatbelt region of Western Australia around York where it is often situated on sand plains and grows in sandy, loamy or clay soils. The population is scattered between Coorow and Ballidu in the north down to around Waterbidden Rock and Bruce Rock in the south.

See also
List of Acacia species

References

lirellata
Acacias of Western Australia
Plants described in 1999
Taxa named by Bruce Maslin